KORE-LP (99.1 FM) is a radio station licensed to serve the community of Entiat, Washington. The station is owned by Community Oriented Radio Endeavours. It airs a variety radio format.

After a letter of permission to use the call letters was given by then KORE-AM Station Owner Larry Knight, the station was assigned the KORE-LP call letters by the Federal Communications Commission on February 4, 2014.

References

External links
 Official Website
 

ORE-LP
ORE-LP
Radio stations established in 2015
2015 establishments in Washington (state)
Variety radio stations in the United States
Chelan County, Washington
Community radio stations in the United States